This is a list of schools in the Roman Catholic Archdiocese of Milwaukee.

Colleges and universities
Alverno College, Milwaukee
Cardinal Stritch University, Milwaukee
Marian University, Fond du Lac
Marquette University, Milwaukee
Mount Mary College, Milwaukee
Sacred Heart Seminary and School of Theology, Hales Corners

Seminaries
St. Francis de Sales Seminary, St. Francis

High schools
Burlington Catholic Central High School, Burlington
Catholic Memorial High School, Waukesha
Divine Savior Holy Angels High School, Milwaukee
Dominican High School, Whitefish Bay
Marquette University High School, Milwaukee
Messmer High School, Milwaukee
Pius XI High School, Milwaukee
St. Anthony High School, Milwaukee
St. Catherine's High School, Racine
St. Joan Antida High School, Milwaukee
St. Joseph High School, Kenosha
St. Lawrence Seminary High School, Mt. Calvary
St. Mary's Springs Academy, Fond du Lac
St. Thomas More High School, Milwaukee
Chesterton Academy High School, Menomonee Falls, Wisconsin

Elementary schools

Dodge County
Consolidated Catholic Schools, K-8, Lomira
St.Katharine Drexel School, K-8, Beaver Dam
St.Mary Catholic School, K-8, Mayville

Fond du Lac County
Consolidated Parochial Elementary, K-6, Johnsburg
Fond du Lac Area Catholic Education System (FACES), K-8, Fond du Lac
Shepherd of the Hills, K-8, Eden
St. Matthew School, K-8, Campbellsport

Kenosha County
All Saints Catholic School, preK-8, Kenosha 
St. Alphonsus School, K-8, New Munster
Holy Rosary, K-8, Kenosha
St. Joseph Catholic Academy, 4K-12, Kenosha
St. Mary-Kenosha, K-8, Kenosha
Mount Carmel-St. Therese Elementary School, K-6, Kenosha
St. Peter, K-8, Kenosha

Milwaukee County
St. Adalbert
St. Alphonsus
St. Anthony
St. Bernadette
St. Bernard
Blessed Sacrament
Blessed Savior-North
Blessed Savior-South
Blessed Savior-East
Blessed Savior-West
St. Catherine of Alexandria
St. Catherine
Catholic East Elementary School, built in 1956, educates in K4-8 grades, alumnus John McGivern, actor.
Catholic Urban Academy-St. Leo
Catholic Urban Academy-St. Rose
St. Charles Borromeo
Christ King
Divine Mercy
St. Eugene
St. Gregory the Great
Holy Family
Holy Wisdom Academy
St. John Kanty
St. John the Evangelist (not to be confused with the Cathedral of St. John the Evangelist)
St. Josaphat
St. Joseph
St. Jude the Apostle
St. Margaret Mary
St. Martin of Tours
St. Mary Parish School, Hales Corners
Mary Queen of Saints Catholic Academy-St. Aloysius
Mary Queen of Saints Catholic Academy-St. Rita (no longer a school MQS is now one school at the St. Aloysius campus)
St. Matthew
St. Matthias
Messmer Preparatory Academy
St. Monica
Mother of Good Counsel
Nativity Jesuit Middle School
Notre Dame Middle School
Our Lady of Good Hope
Our Lady, Queen of Peace
St. Pius X
Prince of Peace/Principe de Paz
St. Rafael the Archangel
St. Robert
St. Roman
St. Sebastian
St. Thomas Aquinas Academy
St. Vincent Palloti

Ozaukee County
St. Francis Borgia
St. Joseph
Lumen Christi
St. Mary
Port Washington Catholic
Rosemary School

Racine County
Our Lady of Grace Academy
John Paul II Academy
St. Joseph
St. Lucy
St. Rita
St. Thomas Aquinas
St. Charles
St. Mary's

Sheboygan County
Christ Child Academy
St. Dominic
Holy Family
St. John the Baptist
St. Mary
Our Lady of the Lakes

Walworth County
St. Andrew
St. Francis de Sales
St. Patrick

Washington County
St. Boniface
St. Frances Cabrini
St. Gabriel
Holy Angels
Holy Trinity
St. Kilian
St. Peter

Waukesha County
St. Agnes
St. Anthony
St. Anthony near the Lake
St. Bruno
St. Charles
St. Dominic
Holy Apostles
St. James's
St. Jerome's
St. Joan of Arc
St. John Vianney
St. Joseph's-Big Bend
St. Joseph's-WC (Waukesha Catholic)
St. Leonard
St. Luke
St. Mary's Visitation
St. Mary's-Menomonee Falls
St. Mary's-WC
St. Paul's
Queen of Apostles School, K-8, Pewaukee
St. William's-WC

References

Milwaukee
Milwaukee
Milwaukee